Gildard, or Gildardus, is the name of two Frankish saints:

Saint Gildard, fifth/sixth-century saint and Bishop of Rouen
Saint Gildard (Lurcy-le-Bourg), seventh-century saint and priest of Lurcy-le-Bourg
Thomas Gildard, 19th-century Scottish architect and author